Hwanjo of Joseon (20 January 1315 – 3 June 1361), personal name Yi Ja-chun (Hangul: 이자춘, Hanja: 李子春), Mongolian name Ulus Bukha (吾魯思不花), was a minor military officer of the Yuan Empire, who later transferred his allegiance to Goryeo. He was the father of Yi Seong-gye, the founder of the Joseon Dynasty of Korea. He was given the temple name Hwanjo by his grandson, King Taejong.

Biography
Yi Ja-chun was a mingghan (chief of one thousand) of the Yuan Dynasty in Ssangseong Prefectures (雙城; present-day Kŭmya County, South Hamgyŏng Province, North Korea - territory which was then administered by the Mongol Empire as part of the terms of the vassaldom of Goryeo to the empire). After Ssangseong was annexed by Goryeo under King Gongmin, he migrated to Hamju and got promoted to manho (the equivalent of the Mongolian tümen, lit. ten thousand or chief of ten thousand). He married a Goryeo-Korean lady from Anbyeon, who became Queen Uihye, the mother of Yi Seong-gye. He died in Hamgyong in 1361.

Since he was glamorized by his descendants, descriptions of Yi Ja-chun's life tend to be contradictory to each other. For example, he is said to have risen to the rank of scholar-official. However, when he died, the king at the time expressed condolences for Ja-chun as if for scholar-officials, implying that Yi Ja-chun was not a scholar-official.

Family
Father: King Dojo of Joseon (? - 1342) (조선 도조)
Grandfather: King Ikjo of Joseon (조선 익조)
Grandmother: Queen Jeongsuk of the Yeongheung Choi clan (정숙왕후 최씨)
Mother: Queen Gyeongsun of the Munju Park clan (경순왕후 박씨)
Grandfather: Park Gwang (박광)
Consorts and their Respective Issue:
Lady Yi of the Hansan Yi clan (한산 이씨, 夫人 李氏; d. 1333)
1st son: Yi Won-gye, Grand Prince Wanpung (이원계 완풍대군, 李元桂, 完豊大君; 1330–1388)
2nd son: Yi Cheon-gye, Grand Prince Yeongseong (이천계 영성대군, 李天桂; 1333–1392)
1st daughter: Lady Yi (부인 이씨, 夫人 李氏) – married Kang U (강우, 康祐)
Queen Uihye of the Yeongheung Choe clan (의혜왕후 최씨)
3rd son: Yi Seong-gye, King Taejo of Joseon (이성계 조선 태조, 李成桂; 1335–1408)
2nd daughter: Princess Jeonghwa (정화공주, 貞和公主) – married Jo In-byeok, Internal Prince Yongwon (조인벽 용원부원군, 趙仁壁 龍原府院君)
Kim Go-eum-ga, Princess Jeongan (김고음가, 金古音加; 정안옹주, 定安翁主; d. 1404) – posthumously honoured as "Royal Noble Consort Jeong of the Kim clan" (정빈 김씨, 定嬪 金氏).
4th son: Yi Hwa, Grand Prince Uian (이화 의안대군, 李和 義安大君; 1348–1408)
Unknown woman
5th son: Yi Yeong (이영, 李英; d. 1394)

In popular culture
Portrayed by Jeon Byung-ok in the 2005–2006 MBC TV series Shin Don.
Portrayed by Jung Dong-gyu in the 2012 SBS TV series Faith.
 Portrayed by Lee Soon-jae in the 2015–2016 SBS TV series Six Flying Dragons.

References

See also 
List of Goryeo people
History of Korea

14th-century Korean people
Korean generals
House of Yi
1315 births
1361 deaths
Yuan dynasty people